Robert Morris Colonials ice hockey may refer to either of the ice hockey teams that represent Robert Morris University:
Robert Morris Colonials men's ice hockey
Robert Morris Colonials women's ice hockey